Preliminary examination may refer to:

In education
 Prelim, an examination that qualifies a student to continue higher level studies and/or allows a student to see how prepared they are for the looming examinations
 Comprehensive examination, a required examination that a student must pass to continue a course of study
 The Preliminary College Scholastic Ability Test in South Korea
 PSAT/NMSQT, a national standardized test taken by high school students in the United States

Legal processes
 An examination performed by an International Preliminary Examining Authority under the Patent Cooperation Treaty
 Preliminary hearing, a court appearance to determine if there is enough evidence to bind the accused for trial

India Civil Services
 A component in several examinations in the Indian Civil Services:
 Civil Services Examination of India
 Bangladesh Civil Service Examination
 Karnataka Administrative Service examination